Goshen is a census-designated place in central Goshen Township, Clermont County, Ohio, United States.  It is centered on State Route 28 (especially where it overlaps with State Routes 132 and 48), approximately midway between Milford and Blanchester.

History
Goshen was founded in 1799 by German and English settlers, namely Jacob Myers, and most of whom had migrated down the Ohio River from western Pennsylvania after fighting for the Colonies during the American Revolutionary War.

2022 tornado

On July 6, 2022, an EF2 tornado struck the town's center, causing damage to multiple buildings including the Fire Department station, resulting in officials declaring a state of emergency. The National Centers for Environmental Information stated the tornado caused $3 million (2022 USD) in damage.

Education
Goshen has a public library, a branch of the Clermont County Public Library.

Goshen Local School District has four schools:

Goshen High School 
 Goshen Middle School
 Spaulding Elementary School
 Marr-Cook Elementary School

Gallery

Population
Goshen Township has just under 16,000 residents

Notable people
Sam Leever - Major League baseball player
John J. Voll - fighter pilot

References

External links
 Community website
 Goshen Historical Society - Goshen Historical Society Homepage

Census-designated places in Clermont County, Ohio
Census-designated places in Ohio